The musimon (also known as the tityrus or tytron) is a charge in European heraldry.  It is a cross between a goat and a sheep; it has the feet and body of a goat, the head and beard of a ram, and two horns from each for a total of four—two curved and two straight.

Musimon can also refer to the real animal known as the European mouflon (Ovis aries musimon), a wild short-fleeced mountain sheep found on the islands of Corsica and Sardinia and parts of mainland Europe.

References

See also
 Polycerate

Heraldic beasts
Mythological caprids